The Pearson Ensign, or Ensign 22, is an American trailerable sailboat that was designed by Carl Alberg as a one-design racer and day sailer and first built in 1962. It is the largest full-keel one-design keelboat class in the United States.

The Ensign is a development of the Pearson Electra.

Production
The design was built by Pearson Yachts of Bristol, Rhode Island and later by Ensign Spars of Dunedin, Florida, both in the United States. A total of 1776 examples were completed, but the design is now out of production.

Development
The Ensign was developed from the Alberg-designed Electra. The Electra design was a commission by Pearson Yachts in 1959 to produce a Midget Ocean Racing Club (MORC) racer. The resulting design was quite successful and about 350 were completed during its six-year production run. Pearson's dealers thought that customers would prefer a design with a bigger cockpit and less space below decks for use in one-design racing and day sailing. Alberg designed the Ensign using the same hull, but with the mast moved  forward, a larger mainsail and smaller fore-triangle.

The resulting design was initially called the Electra Day Sailor and 219 examples were sold in 1962, the first year of production. In 1963, 213 more boats were produced.

Design
The Ensign is a recreational keelboat, built predominantly of fiberglass, with balsawood cores and wood trim. It has a fractional sloop rig, a spooned raked stem, a raised reverse transom, a keel-mounted rudder controlled by a tiller and a fixed long keel. It has foam flotation, making it unsinkable. The only class-permitted mast adjustment while sailing is the backstay which is controlled by a turnbuckle. The boat displaces  and carries  of ballast.

The cuddy cabin has two berths and may be fitted with an optional stove.

The design has sleeping accommodation for two people, with a double "V"-berth in the bow cabin. The head is located in the bow cabin under the bow "V"-berth.

Operational history
The boat is supported by an active class club, the Pearson Yachts Portal.

Racing fleets were first formed when the design entered production, in 1962. The first fleet was formed in Larchmont, New York. By 1963 nine more fleets had been formed, with locations in Houston, Texas; Hingham, Massachusetts; Providence, Rhode Island; Huntington, New York, Port Washington, New York; Miami, Florida; Gibson Island, Maryland and Falmouth, Maine.

By 1994 there were 47 fleets sailing in 20 US states.

In a 2010 review Steve Henkel wrote, "The Ensign is a daysailer-overnighter and one-design racing version of the Pearson Electra cruiser ... Compared to the Electra, she has the same hull, but a tiny cuddy cabin with two bunks, and a much larger cockpit that can hold 8 (or 3 or 4 while racing). Since the year 2000, Ensigns have been built by Ensign Spars of Dunedin, [Florida]. Best features: She is a competent, forgiving, stable, and easy-to-sail one-design class racer. Over the years a strong class organization has developed ... A deep cockpit gives the Ensign above-average crew comfort. With an optional toilet, cushions for the bunks, and perhaps air mattresses for extra sleeping space in the cockpit under a boom tent if desired, she can be made into a plain-jane but reasonably comfortable weekender. Used boat prices can be quite attractive. Worst features: This boat was once considered fast, but that's no longer true compared to modern racing designs—and many of the boats are getting quite old and less competitive, though you can still find fleets to race with here and there. The cockpit is not self-bailing, so a boom tent is required to keep rain from filling her when her crew is not in attendance."

American Sailboat Hall of Fame
The Ensign was inducted into the now-defunct Sail America American Sailboat Hall of Fame in 2002. In honoring the design the hall cited, "She is rarely the belle of the ball. In fact, some hotshots have even been known to call Ensigns 'tubby' as they go zipping by in their dripping-wet performance dinghies. But a funny thing tends to happen when sailors stop to take a closer look at this long lived one-design racer and family daysailer. They notice the old girl is more attractive than they thought. In fact, she's got some pretty nice curves. Before they know it they're in love. ... Stable, comfortable, maybe a bit plain, the Ensign nonetheless has a deep-seated quality that inevitably shines through. No doubt the boat will be taking families and racers sailing for generations to come."

See also
List of sailing boat types

Related design
Pearson Electra

Similar sailboats
Alberg 22
Cape Dory 22
Capri 22
Catalina 22
CS 22
DS-22
Edel 665
Falmouth Cutter 22
Hunter 22
J/22
Marlow-Hunter 22
Marshall 22
Nonsuch 22
Santana 22
Seaward 22
Spindrift 22
Starwind 223
Tanzer 22
US Yachts US 22

References

External links

Keelboats
1960s sailboat type designs
Sailing yachts
Trailer sailers
Sailboat types built in the United States
Sailboat type designs by Carl Alberg
Sailboat types built by Pearson Yachts